is a railway freight terminal operated by Japan Freight Railway Company (JR Freight) on the Tōkaidō Main Line in Shimogyō-ku, Kyoto, Japan.

It was located in the ground east of the track of the San'in Main Line, where now Umekōji Park occupies, until it was moved westward to the present site on March 12, 1990. The name of the freight terminal was changed to the present one on March 12, 2011.

Kyoto Freight Terminal is capable to handle containers of up to 30 ft.

References

Railway stations in Kyoto Prefecture
Railway stations in Japan opened in 1913
Stations of Japan Freight Railway Company